Paul Patrick Smyth (born 10 September 1997) is a Northern Irish professional footballer who plays as a forward for Leyton Orient.

Club career

Linfield 
Smyth broke into the Linfield first team as an 18-year-old in 2015, making his NIFL Premiership debut in a 2–1 defeat to Cliftonville on 14 November 2015. In the 2016–17 season he helped the club lift a treble of trophies; the NIFL Premiership, the Irish Cup, and the County Antrim Shield, while picking up a host of individual awards including the Ulster Young Player of the Year 2016–17.

Queens Park Rangers 
On 29 August 2017, Smyth joined Queens Park Rangers for an undisclosed fee on a two-year contract.

On 1 January 2018, Smyth made his QPR, EFL Championship and professional debut against Cardiff City, scoring the winning goal in the 72nd minute.
He would go onto win the Supporters Young Player of the Year, after an impressive first few months in the first team.

On 20 May 2021, Smyth was released by QPR at the expiry of his contract.

Wycombe Wanderers (loan)
Following a loan spell on loan at Accrington Stanley, Smyth joined Wycombe Wanderers on a season-long loan.

Charlton Athletic (loan)
On 16 October 2020, Smyth joined Charlton Athletic on a season-long loan. He scored his first goal for Charlton in a 4-2 defeat to Burton Albion on 24 November 2020.

Accrington Stanley (loan)
On 28 January 2021, Smyth joined Accrington Stanley on loan until the end of the season, returning to the club he had previously spent time on loan with two seasons before.

Leyton Orient 
Upon his contract expiry, Leyton Orient announced that they signed Smyth on 25 June 2021.

International career 
Having played for Northern Ireland U21 on 22 March 2018, Smyth was called into the senior Northern Ireland squad for the friendly with South Korea on 24 March 2018. He made his debut as an 82nd minute substitute and scored the winning goal in a 2–1 victory three minutes later.

Career statistics

Club

International

International goals 
As of match played 24 March 2018. Northern Ireland score listed first, score column indicates score after each Smyth goal.

Honours

Linfield 

 NIFL Premiership: 2016-17
 Irish Cup: 2016-17
 County Antrim Shield: 2016-17 
 NIFL Charity Shield: 2017

References

External links 
 
 

1997 births
Living people
Linfield F.C. players
Queens Park Rangers F.C. players
Accrington Stanley F.C. players
Wycombe Wanderers F.C. players
Charlton Athletic F.C. players
Leyton Orient F.C. players
English Football League players
Association football forwards
Association footballers from Northern Ireland
NIFL Premiership players
Northern Ireland under-21 international footballers
Northern Ireland international footballers